Luther Nicholson (born July 6, 1989), better known by his stage name Lute, is an American rapper. He is signed to J. Cole's Dreamville Records. He released his first mixtape, West1996, on February 22, 2012. His debut album, West1996 pt. 2, was released on September 29, 2017. His second album, Gold Mouf, was released on October 4, 2021.

Musical career

2012-2014: West1996
Lute is a former member of Forever FC, the Charlotte hip-hop collective which has disbanded. Since then, Lute released his first mixtape titled, West1996, on February 22, 2012. The mixtape received attention from many, including Pete Rock who shared the mixtape on his Twitter page.

2015–present: Signing to Dreamville and West1996 pt. 2
On December 8, 2015, it was officially announced that Lute was signed to J. Cole's, Dreamville Records. Lute was also featured on Dreamville's compilation album titled Revenge of the Dreamers II, on a track titled "Still Slummin'". On August 25, 2017, Lute released his first official single "Juggin'" from his album. His debut album, West1996 pt. 2, had received several push backs, but was finally released on September 29, 2017. Other promotional singles and music videos for the album include songs "Premonition" and "Morning Shift". Lute also went on the 4 Your Eyez Only World Tour with J. Cole in 2017, and with JID and EarthGang in 2017.

2020–present: Gold Mouf
On February 4, 2020, he released the  single "GED (Gettin Every Dolla)", which he performed at the halftime show of the Houston Rockets @Charlotte Hornets on March 7, 2020. On July 6, 2020 he released the single "Life" along with a music video. On August 14, 2020, Lute released the song "Get It and Go", featuring Blakk Soul, from the Madden NFL 21 soundtrack. On May 31, 2021, Lute released the third single, "Myself" featuring Devn. The music video was later released on August 16.

On October 4, 2021, Lute released his second album Gold Mouf. The album includes guest appearances from labelmates JID, Cozz, and Ari Lennox, in addition to Little Brother, Saba, Westside Boogie, BJ the Chicago Kid, Blakk Soul, and Devn.

Discography

Studio albums

Mixtapes

Extended plays

Compilation albums

Singles

As lead artist

Other charted songs

Guest appearances

References

Living people
American hip hop singers
Rappers from North Carolina
Songwriters from North Carolina
Southern hip hop musicians
Dreamville Records artists
1989 births
21st-century American rappers
African-American male rappers
African-American songwriters
21st-century American male musicians
21st-century African-American musicians
20th-century African-American people
American male songwriters